The 1994–95 Segunda División B season started August 1994 and ended May 1995.

Summary before the 1994–95 season 
Playoffs de Ascenso:

 Salamanca (P)
 Getafe (P)
 Orense (P)
 Langreo
 Alavés
 Sestao Sport
 Numancia
 Barakaldo
 Gramanet 
 Manlleu
 Levante
 Figueres
 Extremadura (P)
 Las Palmas 
 Recreativo de Huelva
 Jaén

Relegated from Segunda División:

 Castellón
 Murcia
 Cádiz
 Real Burgos

Promoted from Tercera División:

 Gernika (from Group 4)
 Amurrio (from Group 4)
 Europa (from Group 5)
 Sabadell (from Group 5)
 Terrassa (from Group 5)
 Ontinyent (from Group 6)
 Aranjuez (from Group 7)
 Fuenlabrada (from Group 7)
 Móstoles (from Group 7)
 Moscardó (from Group 7)
 Polideportivo Almería (from Group 9)
 Betis B (from Group 10)
 San Fernando (from Group 10)
 Corralejo (from Group 12)
 Zaragoza B (from Group 16)
 Casetas (from Group 16)
 Manchego (from Group 17)

Relegated:

 Cultural Leonesa
 Tomelloso
 Ponferradina
 Celta Turista
 Basconia
 Andorra
 Utebo
 Touring
 Rubí
 Peña Deportiva
 Cieza
 Manacor
 Ejido
 Atlético Malagueño
 CD Estepona
 Maspalomas
 Arosa

Administrative relegation:
 Real Burgos (financial trouble)

Occupied the vacant spots by administrative relegations:
 Hullera Vasco-Leonesa (occupied the vacant spot of Real Burgos)

Group I
Teams from Asturias, Canary Islands, Castile and León, Galicia and Madrid.

Teams

League table

Results

Top goalscorers

Top goalkeepers

Group II
Teams from Aragon, Basque Country, Cantabria, Castile and Leon, Navarre and La Rioja.

Teams

League Table

Results

Top goalscorers

Top goalkeepers

Group III
Teams from Andorra, Catalonia, Region of Murcia and Valencian Community

Teams

League Table

Results

Top goalscorers

Top goalkeepers

Group IV
Teams from Andalusia, Castilla–La Mancha, Extremadura, Melilla and Region of Murcia.

Teams

League Table

Results

Top goalscorers

Top goalkeepers

Play-offs

Group A

Group B

Group C

Group D

Play-out

Semifinal

Final

External links
Futbolme.com

 
Segunda División B seasons
3

Spain